The Statute Law (Repeals) Act 1986 (c 12) is an Act of the Parliament of the United Kingdom.

This Act was partly in force in Great Britain at the end of 2010.

It implemented recommendations contained in the twelfth report on statute law revision, by the Law Commission and the Scottish Law Commission.

Schedule 2
Paragraph 2 was repealed by section 106(2) of, and Schedule 5 to, the Trade Marks Act 1994.

Paragraph 4(1) was repealed by section 8(1) of, and Schedule 4 to, the Parliamentary Constituencies Act 1986.

See also
Statute Law (Repeals) Act

References
Halsbury's Statutes. Fourth Edition. 2008 Reissue. Volume 41. Page 862.
Peter Allsop (Editor in chief). Current Law Statutes Annotated 1986. Sweet & Maxwell, Stevens & sons. London. W Green & son. Edinburgh. 1987. Volume 1.
The Public General Acts and General Synod Measures 1986. HMSO. London. 1987. Part I. Page 195.
HL Deb vol 468, col 978, vol 469, cols 111 to 114, vol 471, col 728, HC Deb vol 96, col 136.

External links
The Statute Law (Repeals) Act 1986, as originally enacted, from the National Archives.

United Kingdom Acts of Parliament 1986